Tabuaço is a municipality in the district Viseu in Portugal. The population in 2011 was 6,350, in an area of 133.86 km2.

The present mayor is Dr. Carlos André Teles Paulo de Carvalho, elected by the Social Democratic Party (Portugal). The municipal holiday is June 24.

Parishes

Administratively, the municipality is divided into 13 civil parishes (freguesias):

 Adorigo
 Arcos
 Barcos e Santa Leocádia
 Chavães
 Desejosa
 Granja do Tedo
 Longa
 Paradela e Granjinha
 Pinheiros e Vale de Figueira
 Sendim
 Tabuaço
 Távora e Pereiro
 Valença do Douro

Notable people 
 Abel Botelho (1855/56 – 1917) a Portuguese military officer, diplomat and a distinguished Naturalism writer

References

External links

Municipality official website
Volunteer Firefighters official website

Towns in Portugal
Populated places in Viseu District
Municipalities of Viseu District
People from Tabuaço